Fidelity Township is one of eleven townships in Jersey County, Illinois, United States.  As of the 2010 census, its population was 715 and it contained 309 housing units.

Geography

Cities, towns, villages
 Fidelity

Extinct towns
 Bowman

Adjacent townships
 Ruyle Township (north)
 Chesterfield Township, Macoupin County (northeast)
 Shipman Township, Macoupin County (east)
 Brighton Township, Macoupin County (southeast)
 Piasa Township (south)
 Mississippi Township (southwest)
 Jersey Township (west)

Cemeteries
The township contains these five cemeteries: Chapman, Longwill, Luckey-Weber, Moore and Trible.

Major highways
  Illinois Route 16

Demographics

School districts
 Jersey Community Unit School District 100
 Southwestern Community Unit School District 9

Political districts
 Illinois' 19th congressional district
 State House District 97
 State Senate District 49

References
 
 United States Census Bureau 2007 TIGER/Line Shapefiles
 United States National Atlas

External links
 City-Data.com
 Illinois State Archives

Townships in Jersey County, Illinois
Townships in Illinois